Rajesh Vinayakrao Kshirsagar is a Shiv Sena politician from  Kolhapur district, Maharashtra. He is Executive president of Maharashtra state planning commission. He represents Kolhapur North (Vidhan Sabha constituency) in the Maharashtra Legislative Assembly. He has been elected for 2 terms in the Maharashtra Legislative Assembly for 2009 & 2014.

Positions held
 2009: Elected to Maharashtra Legislative Assembly (1st term)
 2014: Re-Elected to Maharashtra Legislative Assembly (2nd term)
 2019: Appointed as Executive president of Maharashtra state planning commission

References

External links
 Official Website
 Shiv Sena Official Website
 Kolhapur district public representatives

Living people
People from Kolhapur district
Maharashtra MLAs 2009–2014
Maharashtra MLAs 2014–2019
Shiv Sena politicians
1968 births
Place of birth missing (living people)
Indian Hindus
Marathi politicians